Heiner Rindermann (born 12 March 1966) is a German psychologist and educational researcher.

Academic career
Rindermann received a Ph.D. in psychology in 1995 on the subject of teacher evaluations from Heidelberg University and completed a Habilitation in 2005 on the topic of teacher quality at University of Koblenz and Landau. In September 2007 he was appointed professor for evaluation and methodology of developmental psychology at the University of Graz. Since April 2010, Rindermann holds the Chair of Educational and Developmental Psychology at the Technical University of Chemnitz.

Rindermann serves on the editorial board of the journal Intelligence, and has been a contributor to Mankind Quarterly, which is commonly described as a white supremacist journal and purveyor of scientific racism. He has also helped to organize conferences for the International Society for Intelligence Research. Rindermann attended the 2018 London Conference on Intelligence, and was one of 15 attendees to collaborate on a letter defending the conference following media reports of its ties to white supremacy, neo-Nazism, and racist pseudoscience. The letter was published in Intelligence in 2018.

Research
Rindermann does research in educational psychology, developmental psychology, differential psychology, pedagogy, and clinical psychology.

Intelligence and education
A 2007 study by Rindermann found a high correlation between the results of international student assessment studies including TIMSS, PIRLS, and PISA, and national average IQ scores. The results were broadly similar to those in Richard Lynn and Tatu Vanhanen's book IQ and the Wealth of Nations. According to Earl B. Hunt, due to there being far more data available, Rindermann's analysis was more reliable than those by Lynn and Vanhanen. By measuring the relationship between educational data and social well-being over time, Rindermann also performed a causal analysis, finding that nations investing in education leads to increased well-being later on.

Some of Rindermann's work has concentrated on the "smart fraction" theory, which states that the prosperity and performance of a society depends on the proportion of the population that is above a particular threshold of intelligence, with the threshold point being well above the general median intelligence level in most societies.

Rindermann's book Cognitive capitalism: Human capital and the wellbeing of nations  was released by Cambridge University Press in 2018.

References

1966 births
Living people
Clinical psychologists
Differential psychologists
German psychologists
Heidelberg University alumni
Intelligence researchers
Writers from Cologne
Race and intelligence controversy